Lodging refers to the use of a short-term dwelling, usually by renting the living space or sometimes through some other arrangement. People who travel and stay away from home for more than a day need lodging for sleep, rest, food, safety, shelter from cold temperatures or rain, storage of luggage and access to common household functions. Lodging is a form of the sharing economy.

Lodging is done in a hotel, motel, hostel, inn or hostal, a private home (commercial, i.e. a bed and breakfast, a guest house, a vacation rental, or non-commercially, as in certain homestays or in the home of friends), in a tent, caravan/campervan (often on a campsite). Lodgings may be self-catering, whereby no food is provided, but cooking facilities are available.

Lodging is offered by an owner of real property or a leasehold estate, including the hotel industry, hospitality industry, real estate investment trusts, and owner-occupancy houses.

Lodging can be facilitated by an intermediary such as a travel website.

Regulations by jurisdiction
Regulation of short-term rentals can include requirements for hosts to have business licenses, payment of hotel taxes and compliance with building, city and zoning standards. The hotel industry has lobbied for stricter regulations on short-term home rental. In addition to government-imposed restrictions, many homeowner associations also limit short term rentals.

Europe
 Amsterdam: Hosts can rent their properties for up to 30 nights per year to a group of no more than four at a time. Short-term rentals are banned in certain parts of the city.
 Barcelona: Vacation apartments are subject to the highest rate of property tax; platforms must share data with regulators.
 Berlin: Short-term rentals require permission from authorities. Hosts can rent individual rooms with the condition that they live in most of the property.
 Ireland: Short-term rentals are restricted to a maximum of 90 days per year for primary residences; registration is required with local authorities.
 London: Short-term rentals are limited to 90 days per year.
 Madrid: Listings without private entrances are banned.
 Palma de Mallorca: Home-sharing sites are banned to contain tourism.
 Paris: Hosts can rent their homes for no more than 120 days a year and must register their listing with the town hall.
 Rome: Short-term rental sites are required to withhold a 21% rental income tax.
 Venice: Hosts must collect and remit tourist taxes.
 Vienna: Short-term rentals are banned in specific "residential zones" within the city, with the exemption of apartments used primarily for the host's own residential needs.

United States

 Arizona: Most regulations are not allowed since municipalities are prohibited from interfering in property rights.
 Boston: The types of properties eligible for use as short-term rentals and the number of days per year a property may be rented are limited.
 Chicago: Hosts are required to obtain a license. Single-night stays are prohibited.
 Jersey City, New Jersey: Hosts are only allowed to rent for 60 days per year.
 Los Angeles: Hosts must register with the city planning department and pay an $89 fee and cannot home-share for more than 120 days in a calendar year.
 Miami: Short-term rentals are banned in most neighborhoods, in part due to lobbying efforts of the hotel industry.
 New York City: Rentals under 30 days are prohibited unless the host is present on the property.
 Portland, Oregon: The number of bedrooms in a single unit that may be listed is limited.
 San Diego: Units for short-term rental are limited to 1% of the housing stock and licenses are required.
 San Francisco: Registration by hosts is required.
 Santa Monica, California: Hosts are required to register with the city and obtain a license and are also prohibited from listing multiple properties.
 Seattle: Hosts must obtain licenses and cannot rent more than two units.
 Washington, D.C.: Hosts must obtain a short-term rental license, and, if the host is not present, those rentals are limited to a combined 90 days each year.
 West New York, New Jersey: Short-term rentals are banned.

Canada
 Toronto: Short-term rentals must be in a host's primary residence and hosts must obtain licenses.
 Vancouver: Short-term rentals must be in a host's primary residence and hosts must obtain licenses.

Asia
 Japan: Hosts are required to register their listing with the government; a home can be rented for a maximum of 180 days per year.
 Singapore: Short-term home rentals of less than three months are illegal.

See also

References

External links

Tourist accommodations